KaMillion, is an American rapper, singer, songwriter, and actress. She was a cast member on season 3 of Love & Hip Hop: Miami and currently co-stars on the HBO Max comedy series Rap Sh!t.

Life and career 
Kamillion was born and raised in Jacksonville, Florida on the city's north side. 

She began her career as a background dancer and vocalist, before establishing herself as a songwriter for artists such as Jordin Sparks, Rihanna, and Diddy.  In 2019, she received a Grammy Award for Best R&B Album for her songwriting credits on H.E.R.'s self-titled album. That year she and Lil Duval were the opening act for the BET Hip Hop Awards.

She gained wider prominence in 2020 after she joined the cast of season three of Love & Hip Hop: Miami. The track "Twerk 4 Me" went viral that year, although it was originally released in 2018. Her track "Fine Azz" is the theme song for A Black Lady Sketch Show's second season.

KaMillion has acted on shows including Star and The Quad. In 2022, she appeared in her first lead role as the character Mia Knight on Rap Sh!t, loosely based on Yung Miami of City Girls.

Songwriting credits 
 Diddy-Dirty Money ft. Trey Songz – "Your Love" (2010)
 Trey Songz – "Already Taken" (2010)
 Rihanna – "Watch n' Learn" (2011)
 Keke Palmer – "Love Me, Love Me Not" and "Takes Me Away" (2012)
 Jordin Sparks – "1000" (2015)
 Samantha Jade – ""Let the Good Times Roll"
 H.E.R.- "Rather Be" (2019)

Awards and nominations

References

External links 
 KaMillion on YouTube
 KaMillion on Instagram
 

1989 births
Living people
21st-century American women singers
21st-century American singers
21st-century American rappers
American women rappers
African-American rappers
African-American women singer-songwriters
African-American actresses
Rappers from Florida
Singer-songwriters from Florida
Actresses from Florida
21st-century American actresses
Entertainers from Florida
People from Jacksonville, Florida
21st-century women rappers